Linda Elvira Zilliacus (née Gyllenberg, born 25 April 1977 in Helsinki) is a Swedish-speaking Finnish actor. Since 2001 she has been married to Tobias Zilliacus.

Selected filmography
 Evil (2003)
 About Sara (2006)
 Moscow Noir (2021)

External links
 

Actresses from Helsinki
Living people
1977 births
Swedish-speaking Finns
21st-century Finnish actresses